Touch N Move is the second extended play by South Korean girl group Sistar. It was released on July 21, 2014, by Starship Entertainment and distributed by LOEN Entertainment. It features the lead single "Touch My Body".

Background and release
On June 5, 2014, Sistar's label, Starship Entertainment, told Newsen that the group was working on a new album and would come back in the beginning of July. The album and the title track's music video were released on July 21, 2014. The group held the album's showcase later on the same day at Ilchi Art Hall in Cheongdam-dong, Seoul, South Korea.

The official music video of "Touch My Body" appeared in the animated series Family Guy in the cut from the 10th episode of the series' Season 14.

Promotion
The promotions of the song "Touch My Body" started on July 24, 2014, on M! Countdown's 10th Anniversary Special. The song was also promoted on the shows, Music Bank, Music Core and Inkigayo.

Commercial performance
Touch N Move debuted at number two on the Gaon Album Chart for the week ending July 26, 2014. By the end of 2014, the album had sold 14,548 copies.

Track listing

Charts

Weekly charts

Year-end charts

Music program wins

References

Sistar EPs
2014 EPs
Korean-language EPs
Dance-pop EPs
Starship Entertainment EPs